Andreas Bechmann (born 28 September 1999 in Frankfurt) is a German athlete competing in the combined events. He represented his country at two editions of the European Indoor Championships.

International competitions

Personal bests

Outdoor
100 metres – 10.73 (+0.3 m/s) (Filderstadt 2019)
400 metres – 47.93 (Filderstadt 2019)
1500 metres – 4:38.30 (Filderstadt 2018)
110 metres hurdles – 15.08 (+0.3 m/s, Frankfurt 2020)
High jump – 2.08 (Hattersheim 2019)
Pole vault – 5.10 (Filderstadt 2019)
Long jump – 7.72 (+0.1 m/s, Tallinn 2021)
Shot put – 15.81 (Tallinn 2021)
Discus throw – 42.51 (Tallinn 2021)
Javelin throw – 61.43 (Filderstadt 2019)
Decathlon – 8132 (Filderstadt 2019)

Indoor
60 metres – 6.96 (Leverkusen 2020)
1000 metres – 2:42.37 (Leverkusen 2020)
60 metres hurdles – 8.37 (Leverkusen 2020)
High jump – 2.10 (Frankfurt 2021)
Pole vault – 5.21 (Frankfurt 2021)
Long jump – 7.50 (Leverkusen 2020)
Shot put – 14.34 (Halle 2019)
Heptathlon – 6097 (Leverkusen 2020)

References

1999 births
Living people
German decathletes
Sportspeople from Frankfurt